Nouréini Tidjani-Serpos (born 15 January 1946 in Porto-Novo, Benin) studied literature in France and obtained a PhD and a D.Lit.in the subject from the University of Lille III (1987).

Apart from knowing several ethnic African languages (Yoruba, Fon, Éwé and Goun), he can speak fluent English, French and Spanish. Noureini is married and a father to two sons and daughters.

Activities
 Chairman of the Pan-African Foundation For Cultural Development (FONPADEC)
 Chairman of the Association for the Institutionalization of the African Intellectual Thought and Memory. (AIMEPIA)
 General Administrator of Radio Benin-Culture
 Professor of African literature

High-level experience at the service of UNESCO 
 As minister-counselor, deputy permanent delegate (1991–1995), then ambassador and permanent delegate of Benin (1995–1998), he has actively contributed to the lifeblood of the organization as a member of the executive council. He was also a member of the Headquarters Committee (1991–1995 and 1997–1999), Rapporteur of the International Conference on Cultural Policy Research (1998), president of the 11th General Assembly of Member-States to the World Heritage Convention, and a member of the committee of the World Heritage Convention.
 As president of the executive board from (1995–1997), he exercised his mandate with devotion and a sense of measured confidence by systematically privileging dialogue and compromise. His actions as the president of the executive council won him the esteem of all his colleagues and the recognition of the General Conference.
 From 1998 to 2010, he put his experience, skills, and knowledge at the service of the Secretariat of the organization, filling the role of Assistant Director-General in the Africa Department, one of UNESCO's two largest priorities.

Humanist, intellectual and creator 
Due to his intellectual qualities as a lettered man, Nouréini Tidjani-Serpos inscribes himself resolutely in a universal approach. He tries to promote a cross-sectoral approach and is thus sensible to the cultures of the world, differences,and to solidarity. As an essayist, literary critic, novelist and poet, Nouréini Tidjani-Serpos has published seven books, many works, and more than a hundred articles in world-renowned magazines.
He was also co-director of the Nigerian Journal of Humanities, director of the “Journal of the Literary Society of Nigeria” and a member of the editing committee of the magazine Présence Africaine.
Like all poets, Nouréini Tidjani-Serpos is a man of truth, liberty, and justice. 
Starting from his first job as a teacher, he has engaged himself in the mission to transmit knowledge, the same function which is at the center of UNESCO's activities. He taught Comparative African Literature from 1972 to 1991 at the University of Paris VIII, at the National University of Benin, and at the Federal University of Benin City in Nigeria. In addition to his teaching roles, he has also performed numerous other management functions at the university: he was chair of the Modern Humanities department, a member of the Administrative Council of the University for Social ,Cultural  and Environmental Research, Chairman of the board of the Council of Administration for the University of Benin City's secondary pilot school (1982–1985),and national president of the Association of Modern Literature of Nigeria(1980–1982).

Publications
 Maïté (poésie).Cotonou:Imprimerie ABM,1967
 Agba'Nla (poésie).Paris:P.J.Oswald,1973
 Le nouveau souffle (poésie).Benin-City: Ambik Press,1986.
 Aspects de la critique africaine (critique littéraire). Paris; Lomé:Editions Silex;Editions Haho,1987.
 Porto-Novo, un rêve brésilien (poésie )en collaboration avec Jean Caffé.Paris:Ed.Kathala, Ed.ASSOCLE,1993.
 Aspects de la critique africaine (Tome2): l'intellectuel africain face au roman,(critique littéraire).Paris: Editions Silex; Editions Nouvelles du Sud,1996.
 Bamikilé (roman).Paris:Présence Africaine,1996.

Honorary distinctions 
 1992: Knight of the Order des Arts et Culture (France)
 1992: Commander of the Palmes académiques (France)
 1996: Officer of the National Order of Merit (Benin)
 2000: Officer of the National Order of Mono (Togo)
 2004: Officer of the National Order of the Ivory Coast
 2005: Commander of the National Order of Benin
 2008: Officer of the National Order of Niger

References

1946 births
Living people
UNESCO officials
Chevaliers of the Ordre des Arts et des Lettres
Commandeurs of the Ordre des Palmes Académiques
People from Porto-Novo
Beninese officials of the United Nations